Purpuricenus opacus is a species of beetle in the family Cerambycidae. It was described by Knull in 1937.

References

Trachyderini
Beetles described in 1937